The House of Visconti di Modrone is a collateral branch of the Visconti of Milan. It originated in the 17th century and still exists today.

Since the 19th century, several lineage members achieved prominence in different domains of public life, including theatre and cinema director Luchino Visconti.

Origins
The Visconti di Modrone descend from Uberto, younger brother of Matteo Visconti, Lord of Milan, between 1287 and 1322. Since the primary residence of the first generations of Uberto's offspring was in the castle of Somma Lombardo, they were known by the surname of Visconti di Somma.

In 1473, the two brothers Francesco and Guido Visconti di Somma divided the castle and the other family properties. In 1683, Niccolò Visconti di Somma, a descendant of Guido, married Teresa Modroni, originating the Visconti di Modrone lineage.

The origins of the Visconti di Modrone are recognizable in their current peerages. The title of Count of Lonate Pozzolo traces back to the properties and noble rights in Lonate Pozzolo, a few kilometres south of Somma Lombardo, received by Guido Visconti di Somma in the division with his brother Francesco.

History

In 1778, Francesco Antonio Visconti di Modrone, grandson of Niccolò Visconti di Somma, obtained the title of Marquess of Vimodrone. In 1813, the title of Duke Visconti di Modrone was granted by Napoleon to Carlo Visconti di Modrone (1770–1836).

Between 1884 and 1890, a family mausoleum was erected at Cassago Brianza. Its appearance, inspired by the dome and the spires of the Milan Cathedral, has become part of the local landscape. During the 19th and 20th centuries, industrial undertakings were started by different family members around Milan: silk production in Canegrate, a weaving plant in San Vittore Olona, a bleaching factory in Somma Lombardo, and a cotton mill in Vaprio d'Adda.

In 1937, the title of Duke of Grazzano Visconti was granted to Giuseppe Visconti by King Victor Emmanuel III of Italy. Grazzano Castle, built in 1395 by Giovanni Anguissola, a brother-in-law of Gian Galeazzo Visconti, passed to the Visconti di Modrone family following the death of marchese Filippo Anguissola in 1870. It is still owned by the family.

Notable members
Some members of this branch were:

 Uberto Visconti di Modrone (1871–1923), entrepreneur
 Marcello Visconti di Modrone (1898–1964), son of Uberto
  (1901–1942)
 Luchino Visconti di Modrone (1906–1976), theatre, opera and film director
 Eriprando Visconti di Modrone (1932–1995), director
 Violante Visconti di Modrone, set decorator in the Academy awards nominated 2017 Call Me by Your Name (film)

References